Good for Your Soul is the third studio album by American new wave band Oingo Boingo, released in 1983. It was produced by Robert Margouleff and was the band's last album to be released on A&M Records.

Composition
The track "No Spill Blood" is inspired by the H. G. Wells novel The Island of Dr. Moreau, specifically Erle C. Kenton's 1932 film adaptation of this novel, titled Island of Lost Souls. In this story, the mad scientist Dr. Moreau performed operations on wild beasts in order to make them more human and able to undertake menial tasks. When the beasts acted in an inappropriate manner, Dr. Moreau would crack his whip and challenge the beasts. In the film, this takes the form of a litany:

 Dr. Moreau: What is the law?
 Sayer of the Law: Not to eat meat, that is the law. Are we not men?
 Beasts (in unison): Are we not men?
 Dr. Moreau: What is the law?
 Sayer of the Law: Not to go on all fours, that is the law. Are we not men?
 Beasts (in unison): Are we not men?
 Dr. Moreau: What is the law?
 Sayer of the Law: Not to spill blood, that is the law. Are we not men?
 Beasts (in unison): Are we not men?

The instrumental track "Cry of the Vatos," named after drummer Johnny "Vatos" Hernandez, contains a back-masked message jokingly promoting Christianity to its listeners.

"Wake Up (It's 1984)" is based on the George Orwell novel Nineteen Eighty-Four. A music video of the band performing the song was aired on January 1, 1984 on the show Good Morning, Mr. Orwell.

Production

Several songs were recorded but cut from the final album and remain unreleased, namely "All the Pieces" and "Waiting for You". Two further songs recorded, "Lightning" and "Cool City", were released on the following album, So-Lo, in 1984. Many additional songs were demo recorded for the album but did not reach the studio sessions, including "Lost Like This", which surfaced many years later on the 1994 album Boingo in a new orchestral arrangement.

Promotion
The music video accompanying "Nothing Bad Ever Happens" depicts the band performing on a paradise island; Elfman appears watching TV, unaware that his house is being robbed behind him, referencing the lyrics of the first verse. He finishes taking a bath, before the tub catches fire, and catches sight of guitarist Steve Bartek being carried down the street by a lynch mob, but decides to ignore. The video ends with Elfman serving the singing severed heads of the band's horn section to three upper class diners, who at first appear shocked, but proceed to eat regardless. The paradise island from the start of the video then appears to get hit by a nuclear bomb while the band continue playing. Elfman said of the song and video in 1986, "It's about somebody who chooses to ignore his neighbors' problems and doesn't get involved - but it's really about getting involved... We can't live like ostriches."

"Who Do You Want to Be" appears in the films Bachelor Party (1984) and Teen Wolf Too (1987).

Reception
Ira A. Robbins of Trouser Press praised Good for Your Soul, particularly producer Robert Margouleff for giving the band a "streamlined and powerfully driven attack", calling "Wake Up (It's 1984)" and "Who Do You Want to Be" "among the most invigorating and engaging things the band has ever done." In a retrospective review, Steven McDonald of AllMusic gave the album two stars out of five, calling it "underrated" but bemoaning its "inconsistency".

Reissue
In 2021, Rubellan Remasters issued a remastered version of Good for Your Soul on both colored vinyl and CD, the latter as an expanded edition with three bonus tracks.

Track listing

2021 CD bonus tracks

Personnel

Oingo Boingo
 Danny Elfman – lead vocals, rhythm guitar
 Steve Bartek – lead guitar
 Ribbs – keyboards
 Kerry Hatch – bass guitar, bass synthesizer
 Johnny "Vatos" Hernandez – drums
 Sam "Sluggo" Phipps – lead tenor saxophone, clarinet, horn solos
 Leon Schneiderman – baritone saxophone, alto saxophone, original instruments
 Dale Turner – trumpet, trombone, horn solos

Additional musicians
 Miles Anderson – additional horns ("Cry of the Vatos", "Dead or Alive", "Wake Up (It's 1984)")
 Mario Guarneri – additional horns ("Cry of the Vatos", "Dead or Alive", "Wake Up (It's 1984)")
 Jimmy Wood – harmonica ("Sweat")
 Marko Babineau – backup vocals ("Dead or Alive", "No Spill Blood")
 Mike Gormley – backup vocals ("Dead or Alive", "No Spill Blood")

Technical
 Robert Margouleff – producer
 Howard Siegel – engineer
 Steve MacMillian – assistant engineer extraordinaire
 Stephen Marcussen – mastering
 Steve Bartek – horn arrangements
 Darron Cray – studio assistance
 Laura Engel – production manager
 Lynn Robb – art direction
 Lane Smith – front cover illustration
 Georganne Deen – back cover illustration
 Francis Delia – innersleeve photography

References

1983 albums
Oingo Boingo albums
A&M Records albums
Albums produced by Robert Margouleff